Pseudomonotes is a monotypic genus of trees in the family Dipterocarpaceae.  It contains a single species Pseudomonotes tropenbosii, which is endemic to the Amazon rainforest of Colombia.

References

Dipterocarpaceae
Flora of the Amazon
Monotypic Malvales genera

Trees of Colombia